Anelosimus monskenyensis is a small species of spider in the family Theridiidae. It has only been found on Mount Kenya, the location from which its name originates. Specimens were shades of brown and white, although color variation is not known. They may kleptoparasitically inhabit the webs of agelenid spiders, although this behavior is not found in other Anelosimus species. Agnarsson and Zhang find it more probable that A. monskenyensis is a social or semi-social spider.

References

Endemic fauna of Kenya
Theridiidae
Spiders of Africa
Spiders described in 2006